Eldon Pattyson (Pat) Black (15 October 19253 November 1999) was a Canadian diplomat.

Black was educated at Selwyn House School and studied law at McGill University.

In 1967, Black was appointed minister (second-in-command) to the Embassy of Canada in France. Canada–France relations were tense following Charles de Gaulle's Vive le Québec libre speech and, in 1969, Black was accused of interfering in French national elections. Years later, in 1996, Black would publish a book titled Direct Intervention: Canada-France Relations, 1967-1974. Graham Fraser, in a review published in the International Journal, praised it as "a valuable account, clear and detailed in its description of the challenge Canadian diplomats faced in dealing, day-to-day, with an ally whose government had taken a decisively hostile position on the central question of Canada's future."

Black returned to Canada, where he took a position as a Department of External Affairs Foreign Service Officer working in foreign intelligence. In 1978 Don Jamieson, Minister of External Affairs, asked Black to fill a new deputy under-secretary position in his department to deal with the increasing threat of terrorism.

In 1985 he was appointed as Ambassador Extraordinary and Plenipotentiary to the Holy See. Prior to that appointment he had been chargé d'affaires in Cairo.

References

External links 
 Foreign Affairs and International Trade Canada Complete List of Posts

1925 births
1999 deaths
Canadian non-fiction writers
Ambassadors of Canada to the Holy See
Canadian expatriates in France
Canadian expatriates in Egypt
20th-century non-fiction writers